Don't Rock the Jukebox is the second studio album by American country music artist Alan Jackson. It was released on May 14, 1991, and produced five singles on the Hot Country Songs charts; the title track, "Someday", "Dallas", and "Love's Got a Hold on You", which all reached number 1, and "Midnight in Montgomery" (a tribute song to Hank Williams) which peaked at number 3. Fellow country music artist George Jones makes a cameo on the album, singing the last line on "Just Playin' Possum". ("The Possum" was one of Jones' nicknames.)

Commercial performance
Don't Rock the Jukebox peaked  at #17 on the U.S. Billboard 200, and #2 on the Top Country Albums. In April 1995, Don't Rock the Jukebox was certified 4 x Platinum by the RIAA.

Track listing

Note
On the vinyl and cassette versions of the album, "Walkin' the Floor Over Me" is placed as track #5, following "Midnight in Montgomery" as the end of Side A.

Personnel
Alan Jackson - lead vocals, backing vocals
Eddie Bayers - drums
Bruce Rutherford - drums, backing vocals
Michael Rhodes - bass guitar
Roger Wills - bass guitar
Roy Huskey Jr. - upright bass
Dirk Johnson - piano
Hargus "Pig" Robbins - piano
Brent Mason - acoustic guitar, electric guitar
Bruce Watkins - acoustic guitar
Danny Groah - electric guitar
Robbie Flint - steel guitar
Paul Franklin - steel guitar
Rob Hajacos - fiddle
 Mark McClurg - fiddle
George Jones - guest vocals on "Just Playin' Possum"

Production
Scott Hendricks - producer, engineer, mixing
Keith Stegall - producer
Hans Akelsen - engineer
Paul Cochrane - engineer
Jeff Coppage - engineer
Bill Heath - engineer
Clark Hook - engineer
Gary Laney - engineer
Mark Nevers - engineer
John David Parker - engineer
Dave Sinko - engineer
Hank Williams - mastering

Charts

Certifications

References

1991 albums
Alan Jackson albums
Arista Records albums
Albums produced by Keith Stegall
Albums produced by Scott Hendricks